Diane R. Follingstad is an American psychologist and author, currently the Women's Circle Endowment professor of Psychology and Director of the Center for Research on Violence Against Women at the University of Kentucky She was previously a Distinguished Professor Emerita at the University of South Carolina.

References

University of Kentucky faculty
University of South Carolina faculty
American psychology writers
University of Colorado alumni
Augsburg University alumni
Living people
Year of birth missing (living people)
Place of birth missing (living people)
Kentucky women writers
Kentucky women psychologists
American women non-fiction writers
American women academics
21st-century American women